FabricLive.28 is a mix album by electronic artist Evil Nine. It was released in 2006 on the Fabric label, as part of the FabricLive albums series.

Track listing
  Will Saul Ft. Ursula Rucker - Where Is It? (Evil Nine Remix) - Air - 6:33
  Simian Mobile Disco - Click - Simian Mobile Disco – 2:54
  Uffie - Ready To Uff (Dub) - Ed Banger – 2:32
  Bodyrockers - Round and Round (Switch Remix) - Mercury – 4:58
  Riton - Anger Man (Riton Re-Rub) - Riton – 3:38
  The Mystery Jets - The Boy Who Ran Away (Riton Extended Dub) - 679 – 4:32
  Thomas Schumacher - Kickschool 79 Spiel-Zeug – 5:05
  Paul Woolford Presents Bobby Peru - Erotic Discourse - 2020 Vision – 3:52
  Boys Noize - Volta 82 - Boys Noize – 3:45
  Bassbin Twins - The Dogs - Bassbin Records – 5:05
  John Starlight - John's Addiction - Television – 5:05
  Daft Punk - Technologic (Digitalism's Highway to Paris Remix) - Virgin – 4:54
  Franz Ferdinand - The Fallen (Justice remix) - Domino – 3:09
  The Kreeps - All I Wanna Do is Break Some Hearts (Boys Noize Remix 2) - Output – 2:54
  Test Icicles - What's Your Damage? (Digitalism Remix) – 5:05
  B-Movie - Nowhere Girl (Freeland Remix) - Some Bizzare – 5:49
  The Clash - London Calling (song) - Sony BMG – 3:30

External links
Fabric: FabricLive.28

Fabric (club) albums
Evil Nine albums
2006 compilation albums